Killmaster may refer to:

 Nick Carter-Killmaster, a series of spy adventures published from 1964 until the late 1990s
 Killmaster, Michigan, an unincorporated community in Alcona County